The Willard Munger State Trail is a system of recreational trails between Hinckley, Minnesota and Duluth, Minnesota.  There are three segments to the trail, Hinckley to Duluth Segment, Alex Laveau Memorial Trail, and Matthew Lourey State Trail.

Hinckley to Duluth Segment

The most well-known trail is a paved trail that starts in Hinckley and goes northeast, to Duluth. Along the way, it goes through Jay Cooke State Park and close to Banning State Park. The  segment between Carlton and Duluth is particularly scenic, as it passes through forested areas and rock cuts before opening up to scenic views of the Lake Superior harbor and downtown Duluth.

The trail was originally part of the St. Paul and Duluth Railroad, originally built as the Lake Superior and Mississippi Railroad and later part of the Northern Pacific Railway.

The trail is named after Willard Munger, a Minnesota state legislator who devoted his legislative career to trail development and environmental protection from 1954 until his death in 1999.  The Munger family owns the Willard Munger Inn near the end of the trail in Duluth.

Alex Laveau Memorial Trail
This segment of the trail connects Carlton and Wrenshall, running just south of Jay Cooke State Park, and terminates at Minnesota State Highway 23.  From there, bicyclists can ride paved shoulders into the Gary-New Duluth neighborhoods of Duluth.  Alex Laveau was a former county commissioner who advocated reusing abandoned railways as recreational trails.

Matthew Lourey State Trail
The Matthew Lourey State Trail runs along Minnesota's eastern boundary.  It starts in Chengwatana State Forest, runs northeasterly along the St. Croix River through the St. Croix State Park and into the St. Croix State Forest, and then in a northerly direction through the Nemadji State Forest before terminating near Holyoke.  This segment of the trail is unpaved, and is intended for snowmobile, motorcycle, ATV, horseback riding, and mountain biking.

References
 Minnesota DNR - Willard Munger State Trail.  Accessed March 31, 2006.
 

Protected areas of Carlton County, Minnesota
Rail trails in Minnesota
Northern Pacific Railway
Protected areas of Pine County, Minnesota
Protected areas of St. Louis County, Minnesota